Urbano Cioccetti (26 November 1905 – 9 May 1978) was an Italian Christian Democrat politician. He was mayor of Rome (1958–1962). He died in Rome, Italy.

References

1905 births
1978 deaths
20th-century Italian politicians
Christian Democracy (Italy) politicians
Knights Grand Cross of the Order of Merit of the Italian Republic
Mayors of Rome